Reading the Vampire Slayer is a 2004 academic publication relating to the fictional Buffyverse established by TV series, Buffy and Angel.

Book description and contents

Covers both Buffy (up to its final season) and Angel (up to Season 4). The book gives in depth analysis highlighting show titles, quotes, key comments that foreshadow something else. The book progresses season by season discussing character growth, and many hidden metaphors.

These are the contents for the first edition (published 2001):

Reviews
Pyramid

References

External links
Phil-books.com - Review of this book
Nika-summers.com - Review of "Reading the Vampire Slayer"

2001 non-fiction books
Books about the Buffyverse